Frederick John Marco Magdaluyo Fructuoso (born March 31, 1977) is a Filipino actor, comedian, businessman, and former hip hop dancer. He rose to fame in the early 1990s as part of the teen boy group "Gwapings" along with Mark Anthony Fernandez, Jomari Yllana and later with Jao Mapa.

Fructuoso has been recently portraying mature roles particularly villain roles, father characters and supporting roles.

Personal life
Fructuoso is the grandson of Carlos Magdaluyo, who is a former director of PAGCOR and is of Aklanon descent.

He is known for having past relationships with actresses Ara Mina, Joyce Jimenez, Aubrey Miles, Priscilla Almeda and Toni Gonzaga.

He was the boyfriend of Claudine Barretto before Mark Anthony Fernandez.

Fructuoso was married to a non-showbiz woman named Gian with whom he has four children. They separated sometime in 2021 after 16 years of marriage. He also has one child named Frederick ("Tres") with another previous ex-wife.

Besides acting, Fructuoso also used to have a construction business shared with his ex-wife Gian. He currently owns a fastfood chain called Gwapigs Porkchop and a motorcycle shop called Gwapings Moto Powered by ETech.

In 2021, Fructuoso became a grandfather at age 44 when his then-21-year-old eldest son Frederick fathered a son named Leo with his wife Anne Carlene.

Filmography

Television

Film
 On The Job 2: The Missing 8 (2021)
 Djagwar: Havey O Waley (2012) as Ruel
 T2 (2009) as Elias
 Most Wanted (2000)
 Mama, Dito Sa Aking Puso (1997)
 Manananggal In Manila (1997) as Jonas
 Virgin Island (1997)
 Wang Wang, Buhay Bombero (1997)
 Kulayan Natin Ang Bukas (1997) as Jay
 Unang Tibok (1996)
 Magic Kombat (1995) as Luigi
 Ging Gang Gooly Giddiyap: I Love You Daddy as Emil (1994)
 Sobra Talaga... Over (1994)
 Bulag, Pipi At Bingi (1993)
 Dino... Abangan Ang Susunod Na... (1993) - Eric's 1st Comedy Movie
 Rollerboys (1995) as Busty Morales
 Eskapo (1995) as Raffy Lopez
 Gwapings Dos (1993) as Alvin
 Gwapings: The First Adventure (1992) as Archie

Awards and nominations

References

External links

1977 births
Living people
People from Parañaque
Filipino people of Spanish descent
Filipino male television actors
Filipino male comedians
Filipino male film actors
Participants in Philippine reality television series
Star Magic
ABS-CBN personalities
GMA Network personalities